Patali (also Romanized as Pātalī; also known as Kheyrābād-e Pātelī) is a village in Jahadabad Rural District, in the Central District of Anbarabad County, Kerman Province, Iran. At the 2006 census, its population was 492, in 105 families.

References 

Populated places in Anbarabad County